David Beresford (born 11 November 1976) is an English former footballer. A midfielder, he made 236 league appearances in a 12-year career in the Football League. He also won 14 caps for the England under-16s and under-18s.

He began his career at Oldham Athletic, making 64 league appearances between 1994 and 1997, also playing briefly for Swansea City on a loan spell in 1995. He transferred to Huddersfield Town for a £350,000 fee in March 1997, but never lived up to his price tag at the Galpharm Stadium. He enjoyed short loan spells at Preston North End and Port Vale, before joining Hull City on a free transfer in June 2001. He switched to Plymouth Argyle in July 2002. Loaned out to Macclesfield Town in October 2003, he was allowed to join Tranmere Rovers the following month. He signed with Macclesfield Town in July 2005, before retiring the following year.

Club career
Beresford began his career with Oldham Athletic, being named as a squad member at Boundary Park in 1993–94, just as the club suffered relegation out of the Premier League, in the last season in the reign of Joe Royle. They finished 14th in the First Division in 1994–95 under new boss Graeme Sharp, before finishing 18th in 1995–96. He was loaned out to Swansea City in 1995, and made six appearances for the struggling Second Division side. Beresford made 38 appearances in 1996–97, as the "Latics" suffered relegation. New manager Neil Warnock sold Beresford to Brian Horton's Huddersfield Town for a £350,000 fee in March 1997.

He featured six times in the remainder of 1996–97, as the "Terriers" retained their First Division status by holding on to 20th place. He played just nine times in 1997–98, falling completely out of the first team picture after new boss Peter Jackson arrived at the Galpharm Stadium in October. He scored twice in 23 games in 1998–99, but became frozen out of the first team picture completely with the arrival of Steve Bruce in 1999–2000. He was loaned out to Preston North End, but only made two starts for the "Lambs", who went on to win the Second Division title under David Moyes. He still could not get a run in the Huddersfield team in 2000–01, despite the arrival of Lou Macari in October. He was loaned out to Port Vale for four weeks on 15 September, in a move that reunited him with former boss Brian Horton, but could only make four goalless Second Division appearances for the "Valiants".

He joined Brian Little's Hull City on a free transfer in June 2001. He played 47 games for the "Tigers", who posted an 11th-place finish in the Third Division. Beresford signed for Plymouth Argyle in July 2002. He made 16 appearances for Paul Sturrock's "Pilgrims" in 2002–03. His only contribution to the 2003–04 Second Division title winning campaign was a late substitute appearance at the start of the season, and he was loaned out to David Moss's Macclesfield Town in October 2003. He played five Third Division games at Moss Rose, before he joined Tranmere Rovers permanently the following month, in a move that reunited him with former boss Brian Little. His signing was announced a day after Macclesfield announced that they had extended his loan deal for a further four weeks. He played 31 games for the "Superwhites" in 2003–04, as the club missed out on the Second Division play-offs by two places and six points. He made just 24 appearances in 2004–05, but scored past Hartlepool United in the play-off semi-final second leg at Prenton Park, taking the game into extra-time; he scored in the resulting penalty shoot-out, but Rovers were defeated 6–5 after Ian Sharps missed his sudden death penalty. This was to be his last appearance for the club, as Beresford was released at the end of the season. He joined Macclesfield Town in July 2005, signing for manager Brian Horton for a third time. He made just 12 starts for the League Two club, and departed at the end of the season.

International career
Beresford won ten caps for the England under-16s between September 1992 and April 1993. He then went on to win five caps for the England under-18s between July 1994 and April 1995.

Career statistics
Source:

References

1976 births
People from Middleton, Greater Manchester
Living people
English footballers
England youth international footballers
Association football midfielders
Oldham Athletic A.F.C. players
Swansea City A.F.C. players
Huddersfield Town A.F.C. players
Preston North End F.C. players
Port Vale F.C. players
Hull City A.F.C. players
Plymouth Argyle F.C. players
Tranmere Rovers F.C. players
Macclesfield Town F.C. players
Premier League players
English Football League players
Schoolteachers from Yorkshire